English Country Tune is a 2011 puzzle video game developed and published by Increpare Games, the studio of designer Stephen Lavelle.

Gameplay
The first few levels are much like Sokoban puzzles, in which objects are pushed around on a grid by a player-controlled figure until they reach specified target cells; subsequent levels add other elements with different unconventional behaviors and goals. The levels often involve three-dimensional structures, around which the player must navigate using logic and abstraction.

Development

Lavelle developed the prototype, which was in part inspired by Spacechem, at a game jam event. While finishing the game up, however the game, in Lavelle's own words, "ended up getting a lot bigger and changing a hell of a lot." Lavelle has also cited Cogs as an inspiration.

Reception
Upon release, English Country Tune received mostly positive reviews, with its iOS version holding a score of 78/100 based on four critic reviews.

References

External links 
 

Casual games
IOS games
Linux games
MacOS games
Puzzle video games
2011 video games
Video games developed in the United Kingdom
Windows games
Single-player video games